Serge Noël (23 September 1956 – 27 October 2020) was a Belgian poet and author.

Bibliography
Le violon-loup (1979)
Dormir (1981)
Al Majnûn (1985)
Voyage à Auschwitz (1998)
Enfants grimaciers, poèmes (1998)
Je suis la plus petite place Tien Anmen du monde (1999)
Mémorial des morts sans tombeau (2000)
Reconstruisons notre chant d’amour et de guerre (2004)
Passer le temps ou lui casser la gueule (2005)
Journal d’un homme seul (2006)
Un communiqué du ministère de la nuit (2006)
Un flic ordinaire (2007)
Le Fils du Père Noël (2007)
La Passe magique (2011)
Exil de nos ivresses (2011)
La beauté des blessures (2012)
Aux premières heures d'un jour nouveau (2013)
Danser avec le diable (2014)
A la limite du prince charmant (2018)

Collective Works
Bruxelles/Tanger (2006)
Paroles d’exils (2007)
Trois planètes (2009)
J'ai deux amours (2012)
Classe de oufs! (2013)
Des intégrations (2014)
Visages humains (2015)

Prizes
Prix George Lockem of the Académie royale de langue et de littérature françaises de Belgique for Dormir (1981)
1st and 5th Prize of the Université libre de Bruxelles (2001)
Prix Jeunesse Education permanente of the Fédération Wallonie/Bruxelles for Bruxelles/Tanger (2007)
Prix Gros sel for Exil de nos ivresses (2012)

References

1956 births
2020 deaths
Belgian poets
Belgian writers
People from Ixelles